Eric "Roscoe" Ambel is a New York City–based guitarist and record producer. His discography consists of 3 studio albums, 1 live album, and 1 compilation. In addition, he has been featured a performer and producer on many albums by other artists.

Solo albums

Studio
 1988: Roscoe's Gang (Enigma) reissued on Lakeside Lounge Records in 2004
 1995: Loud & Lonesome (East Side Digital) reissued on Lakeside Lounge in 2004
 2016: Lakeside (Lakeside Lounge)

Live
 2017: Roscoe Live: Vol 1 (Lakeside Lounge)

Compilations
 2004: Knucklehead (Lakeside Lounge)

With The Yayhoos
 1996: Fear Not the Obvious (Bloodshot)
 2006: Put The Hammer Down (Lakeside Lounge)

With the Del Lords
 1984: Frontier Days (EMI America)
 1986: Johnny Comes Marching Home (EMI America)
 1988: Based on a True Story (Enigma)
 1989: Howlin' at the Halloween Moon (Restless)
 1990: Lovers Who Wander (Enigma)
 2013: Elvis Club (Gb / MRI)

With Steve Earle
 2000: Live from Austin TX November 12, 2000 CD, DVD (New West) released 2006
 2002: Jerusalem (E-Squared / Artemis)
 2004: The Revolution Starts Now (E-Squared / Artemis)

As producer

1990 - 1995
 1992: Blood Oranges - Lone Green Valley EP (East Side Digital)
 1992: Nils Lofgren - Crooked Line (Rykodisc)
 1994: Blood Oranges - The Crying Tree (East Side Digital)
 1994: Go To Blazes - Any Time ... Anywhere (East Side Digital)
 1994: The Bottle Rockets - The Brooklyn Side (East Side Digital)
 1995: Blue Mountain - Dog Days (Roadrunner)
 1995: Cheri Knight - The Knitter (East Side Digital)
 1995: Simon And The Bar Sinisters - Look At Me I'm Cool!!! (Upstart)
 1995: The Cowslingers - That's Truckdrivin''' (Sympathy For The Record Industry)
 1995: Mojo Nixon - Whereabouts Unknown (Ripe & Ready)
 1995: Mojo Nixon - "Girlfriend in a Coma" (Ripe & Ready)

1996 - 1999
 1996: Go To Blazes - Waiting Around For The Crash (East Side Digital)
 1996: Martin's Folly - Martin's Folly (Johnson's Wax)
 1996: Mary Lee's Corvette - Mary Lee's Corvette (Ripe & Ready)
 1997: The Bottle Rockets - 24 Hours A Day (Atlantic)
 1997: Love Riot - Killing Time EP (Squirrel Boy)
 1997: Simon Chardiet - Bug Bite Daddy (New Rounder / Upstart)
 1998: The Blacks - Dolly Horrorshow (Bloodshot)
 1999: The Backsliders - Southern Lines (Mammoth)
 1999: Mary Lee's Corvette - True Lovers Of Adventure (Wild Pitch)
 1999: The Bottle Rockets - Brand New Year (Doolittle / New West)

2000 - 2009
 2000: Freedy Johnston - Live At 33 1/3 (Singing Magnet)
 2001: Big In Iowa - Green Pop (Blue Rose)
 2001: Demolition String Band - Pulling Up Atlantis (Okra-Tone)
 2002: Mary Lee's Corvette - Blood On The Tracks (Bar/None)
 2002: Miss Tammy Faye Starlite and the Angels Of Mercy - On My Knees (self-released)
 2004: The Bottle Rockets - Leftovers (New West)
 2006: Sugar Mountain - In the Raw (Brewery)
 2007: Kasey Anderson - Reckoning (Terra Soul / Blue Rose)
 2007: Spanking Charlene - Dismissed With a Kiss - (Slacker)
 2009: The Bottle Rockets - Lean Forward (Bloodshot)
 2009: Kasey Anderson - Nowhere Nights (Red River)

2010 - 2017
 2010: Esquela - The Owl Has Landed (Bovina)
 2011: Ben Hall - Ben Hall! (Tompkins Square)
 2012: Jimbo Mathus and the Tri-State Coalition - White Buffalo (Fat Possum)
 2013: Esquela - Are We Rolling? (Bovina)
 2014: [Girls, Guns and Glory - Good Luck (Lonesome Day)
 2015: The Bottle Rockets - South Broadway 0Athletic Club (Bloodshot)
 2015: Jimbo Mathus - Blue Healer (Fat Possum)
 2016: Esquela - Canis Majoris (Bovina)
 2017: Jack Grace - Everything I Say Is A Lie (self-released)

As primary artist/song contributor
 1999: various artists - This Note's for You Too! A Tribute to Neil Young (Inbetweens Records) - track 2-3, "Revolution Blues"
 2005: various artists - Lowe Profile: A Tribute To Nick Lowe (Brewery) - track 1-1, "12 Step Program (To Quit You Babe)"
 2007: various artists - More Barn: A Tribute to Neil Young (Slothtrop) - track 17, "Cocaine Eyes" with the Roscoe Trio

As composer
 1995: Dan Zanes - Cool Down Time (Private Music) - track 2, "No Sky" (co-written with Dan Zanes and Mitchell Froom)
 1999: Steve Wynn - My Midnight (Zero Hour) - track 1, "Nothing But The Shell" (co-written with Steve Wynn)
 2011: Kasey Anderson and the Honkies - Heart Of A Dog (Red Parlor Records) - track 1, "The Wrong Light" (co-written with Kasey Anderson)
 2016: The Bullhounds - To Rock & to Serve (Mighty / Rock Bastard / Traffic) - track 1, "Ain't Easy Being Cool" (co-written with James Marshall and Jeremy Tepper)

Other appearances
 1981: Joan Jett - Bad Reputation (Boardwalk) - guitar on "What Can I Do for You?" (2006 reissue)
 1981: Joan Jett - I Love Rock 'n Roll (Boardwalk) guitar on "Crimson and Clover" and "Little Drummer Boy"
 1989: Syd Straw - Surprise (Virgin) - guitar on "Think Too Hard"
 1990: Mojo Nixon - Otis (Enigma) - guitar
 1991: Joey Skidmore - Welcome To Humansville (MOP-TOP) - guitar
 1994: Joey Skidmore - Joey Skidmore (DixieFrog)
 1996: The Kennedys - Life Is Large (Green Linnet) - guitar on "Heart Of Darkness"
 1996: The Bludgers - Better Off At Home (Hammerhead) - guitar on "Tomorrow In Australia"
 2001: Run DMC - Crown Royal (Arista) - guitar on "Take The Money And Run"
 2003: Marshall Crenshaw - What's In The Bag? (Razor & Tie) - Dulcitar, bass on "Take Me With U"
 2005: Terry Anderson - Terry Anderson And The Olympic Ass-Kickin Team (Doublenaught) - guitar on "Purple GTO"
 2006: Casey Neill - Brooklyn Bridge (In Music We Trust)
 2006: Thea Gilmore - Harpo's Ghost (Sanctuary) - guitar, harmonium
 2007: Keri Noble - Let Go (Seoul Records)
 2007: Miss Ohio - Low'' (L'Oceanic) - keyboards

References

External links 
 
 
 
 

Discographies of American artists
Rock music discographies